Chahar Farsakh (also Romanized as Chahār Farsakh and Chehār Farsakh; also known as Chahār Farsang and Chehār Farsang) is a village in Neh Rural District, in the Central District of Nehbandan County, South Khorasan Province, Iran. At the 2006 census, its population was 656, in 178 families.

References 

Populated places in Nehbandan County